Coastal Elites is a 2020 American comedy television film directed by Jay Roach and written by Paul Rudnick. The film stars Bette Midler, Sarah Paulson, Kaitlyn Dever, Dan Levy and Issa Rae as five people, living in either New York City or Los Angeles, navigating the COVID-19 pandemic. It premiered on HBO on September 12, 2020. The film received mixed-to-negative reviews from critics.

Cast
 Bette Midler as Miriam Nessler
 Kaitlyn Dever as Sharynn Tarrows
 Dan Levy as Mark Hesterman
 Sarah Paulson as Clarissa Montgomery
 Issa Rae as Callie Josephson

Production
In June 2020, it was announced Bette Midler, Sarah Paulson, Kaitlyn Dever, Dan Levy and Issa Rae had joined the cast of the film, with Jay Roach directing from a screenplay by Paul Rudnick. The project was shot remotely.

Reception
The website's critics consensus reads, "The top-shelf cast gives Coastal Elites a passionate pulse, but redundant speechifying and the stilted format result in a repetitive preaching to the choir." Metacritic assigned the film a weighted average score of 58 out of 100, based on 18 critics, indicating "mixed or average reviews".

References

External links
 

2020 television films
2020 films
2020 comedy films
2020s English-language films
American comedy television films
Films about the COVID-19 pandemic
Films directed by Jay Roach
Films set in 2020
Films set in Los Angeles
Films set in New York City
Films with screenplays by Paul Rudnick
HBO Films films
Screenlife films
2020s American films